Parliamentary elections were held in Bolivia in May 1933 to elect half the seats in the Chamber of Deputies and one-third of the Senate.

Results

References

Elections in Bolivia
Bolivia
Legislative election
Election and referendum articles with incomplete results